AlphaStar may refer to:

AlphaStar (satellite broadcasting service), defunct direct-to-home satellite broadcasting service
AlphaStar (software), StarCraft bot developed by DeepMind

See also
Alpha Star Aviation, charter airline based in Riyadh, Saudi Arabia